Tennyson is a locality in north central Victoria, Australia.

History 
Tennyson was settled in the early 1870s and was originally named Pannoomilloo West. In 1875 a school opened called Pannoo Bamawm. In 1909 the Waranga Western Channel was extended, running through Pannoo Bamawm. In 1910 a Hall and Post office opened and the localities name was changed to Tennyson. In 1954 a school opened in Lockington and the school in Tennyson was shut down.

References

External links

Towns in Victoria (Australia)